Arthur Hoare may refer to:

 Arthur Hoare (cricketer, born 1840) (1840–1896), English cricketer
 Arthur Hoare (cricketer, born 1821) (1821–1894), English cricketer